Kiskunhalas is a district in south-eastern part of Bács-Kiskun County. Kiskunhalas is also the name of the town where the district seat is found. The district is located in the Southern Great Plain Statistical Region.

Geography 
Kiskunhalas District borders with Kiskunmajsa District to the northeast, Mórahalom District (Csongrád County) to the east, the Serbian district of North Bačka and Bácsalmás District to the south, Jánoshalma District to the west, Kiskőrös District to the northwest. The number of the inhabited places in Kiskunhalas District is 9.

Municipalities 
The district has 2 towns and 7 villages.
(ordered by population, as of 1 January 2012)

The bolded municipalities are cities.

Demographics

In 2011, it had a population of 43,849 and the population density was 53/km².

Ethnicity
Besides the Hungarian majority, the main minorities are the Roma (approx. 1,800), German (500), Serb and Croat (100).

Total population (2011 census): 43,849
Ethnic groups (2011 census): Identified themselves: 41,062 persons:
Hungarians: 38,161 (92.94%)
Gypsies: 1,774 (4.32%)
Germans: 479 (1.17%)
Others and indefinable: 648 (1.58%)
Approx. 3,000 persons in Kiskunhalas District did not declare their ethnic group at the 2011 census.

Religion
Religious adherence in the county according to 2011 census:

Catholic – 18,978 (Roman Catholic – 18,910; Greek Catholic – 66);
Reformed – 3,565;
Evangelical – 376;
other religions – 828; 
Non-religious – 8,023; 
Atheism – 419;
Undeclared – 11,660.

Gallery

See also
List of cities and towns of Hungary

References

External links
 Postal codes of the Kiskunhalas District

Districts in Bács-Kiskun County